may refer to:
Libuše, legendary ancestor of the Přemyslid dynasty and the Czech people as whole
Libuše (name), Czech female given name (includes people bearing the name)
Libuše (opera), opera by Bedřich Smetana
Libuse, Louisiana, town in the United States